Niobium dioxide, is the chemical compound with the formula NbO2. It is a bluish-black non-stoichiometric solid with a composition range of NbO1.94-NbO2.09. It can be prepared by reducing Nb2O5 with H2 at 800–1350 °C. An alternative method is reaction of Nb2O5 with Nb powder at 1100 °C.

Properties 
The room temperature form of NbO2 has a tetragonal, rutile-like structure with short Nb-Nb distances, indicating Nb-Nb bonding. The high temperature form also has a rutile-like structure with short Nb-Nb distances. Two high-pressure phases have been reported: one with a rutile-like structure (again, with short Nb-Nb distances); and a higher pressure with baddeleyite-related structure.

NbO2 is insoluble in water and is a powerful reducing agent, reducing carbon dioxide to carbon and sulfur dioxide to sulfur. In an industrial process for the production of niobium metal, NbO2 is produced as an intermediate, by the hydrogen reduction of Nb2O5. The NbO2 is subsequently reacted with magnesium vapor to produce niobium metal.

References

Niobium(IV) compounds
Non-stoichiometric compounds
Transition metal oxides